Navua F.C. is a Fijian football team playing in the second division of the Fiji Football Association competitions.

They are based in Navua, which is situated on the southern side of the main island of Viti Levu, between the town of Sigatoka and the city of Suva. Their home stadium is Thomson Park. Their uniform is red shirt, blue shorts and white socks.

History
Navua F.C. was founded in 1943, with the formation of the Navua Soccer Association, under the leadership of C.P. Singh, a former member of the Legislative Council. The team languished in the second division has moved up to the first division, and has performed credibly in recent times.

Current squad
Squad for the 2018 Inter-District Championship

Achievements
 Fiji Senior League: 1
  2019
League Championship (for Districts): 
Winner: 0
Runner-up: 1 (2005)
 Inter-District Championship: 
Winner: 1 (2009)
Runner-up: 0
 Inter-District Championship - Second Division: 
Winner: 2 (2018, 2019)
Runner-up: 0
Battle of the Giants: 
Winner: 1 (2005)
Runner-up: 1 (1995)
Fiji Football Association Cup Tournament: 
Winner: 3 (2003, 2008, 2009)
Runner-up: 2 (2004, 2010)

See also 
 Fiji Football Association

References

Bibliography
 M. Prasad, Sixty Years of Soccer in Fiji 1938–1998: The Official History of the Fiji Football Association, Fiji Football Association, Suva, 1998.

Football clubs in Fiji
1943 establishments in Fiji